Krzepin  is a village in the administrative district of Gmina Secemin, within Włoszczowa County, Świętokrzyskie Voivodeship, in south-central Poland.

The village has a population of 110.

References

Krzepin